Henry Krumb School of Mines encompasses the Earth and Environmental Engineering department of Columbia University's School of Engineering and Applied Science. The school is named in honor of Henry Krumb, an American mining engineer and innovator.

Columbia University